Aumann's agreement theorem was stated and proved  by Robert Aumann in a paper titled "Agreeing to Disagree", which introduced the set theoretic description of common knowledge. The theorem  concerns agents who share a common prior and update their probabilistic beliefs by Bayes' rule. It states that if the probabilistic beliefs of such agents, regarding a fixed event,  are common knowledge then these probabilities must coincide. Thus, agents cannot agree to disagree, that is have common knowledge of a disagreement over the posterior probability of a given event.

The Theorem
The model used in Aumann to prove the theorem consists of a finite set of states  with a prior probability , which is common to all agents. The posterior probability of agent , denoted  is the conditional probability of  given . 
Fix an event  and let  be the event that for each , . The theorem claims that if the event  that  is common knowledge is not empty then all the numbers  are the same. The proof follows directly from the definition of common knowledge. Thus, for each , . The theorem was proved for two agents but the proof for any number of agents is similar.

Extensions
Monderer and Samet relaxed the assumption of common knowledge and assumed instead common -belief of the posteriors of the agents. They gave an upper bound of the distance between the posteriors . This bound approaches 0 when  approaches 1.

Ziv Hellman relaxed the assumption of a common prior and assumed instead that the agents have priors that are -close in a well defined metric. He showed that common knowledge of the posteriors in this case implies that they are -close. When  goes to zero, Aumann's original  theorem is recapitulated.

Nielsen extended the theorem to non-discrete models in which knowledge is described by -algebras rather than partitions.

Knowledge which is defined in terms of partitions has the property of negative introspection. That is, agents know that they do not know what they do not know. However, it is possible to show that it is impossible to agree to disagree even when knowledge does not have this property. 

Halpern and Kets argued that players can agree to disagree in the presence of ambiguity, even if there is a common prior. However, allowing for ambiguity is more restrictive than assuming heterogeneous priors.

The impossibility of agreeing to disagree, in Aumann's theorem, is a necessary condition for the existence of a common prior. A stronger condition can be formulated in terms of bets.
The impossibility of agreeing on the profitability of a bet is a stronger condition than the impossibility of agreeing to disagree, and moreover, it is a necessary and sufficient condition for the existence of a common prior.

Dynamics
A dialogue between two agents is a dynamic process in which, in each stage, the agents  tell each other their posteriors of a given event . Aumann suggested that such a process leads the agents to commonly know their posteriors, and hence, by the agreement theorem, the posteriors at the end of the process coincide. Geanakoplos and Polemarchakis proved it for dialogues in finite state spaces. Polemarchakis showed that any pair of finite sequences of the same length that end with the same number  can be obtained as a dialogue. In contrast, Di Tillio and co-authors showed that infinite dialogues must satisfy certain restrictions on their variation. Scott Aaronson studied the complexity and rate of convergence of various types of dialogues with more than two agents.

References

Further reading 
 

Bayesian statistics
Economics theorems
Game theory
Probability theorems
Rational choice theory
Theorems in statistics